XAT may refer to:

XLRI Admission Test, an admission test conducted by XLRI in India
AT&T Aviation Division, United States (ICAO Code)